Apple rubbery wood virus, also known as apple rubodvirus is a viral disease that causes apple rubbery wood in apple and pear cultivars. There are two varieties: ARWV 1 and ARWV 2. It gets its name from its distinctive effect that it has on its host trees, which show unusual flexibility in the stems and branches after a few years of infection. This often results in the maturing fruits of the tree to weigh down the branches such that they lay on the ground. Apple rubbery wood, or ARW, occurs worldwide, affecting apple and pear cultivars in most developed countries.

Taxonomy
Originally, ARW was assumed to be caused by phytoplasmas, but it could not be confirmed through multiple tests.
In 2019, it was suggested that both ARW 1 and 2 are given their own new genus, "Rubodvirus" (Rubbery wood virus), the name coming from Rub- in "Rubbery", and -od in "wood".

Symptoms
Limbs of the host tree become abnormally flexible, becoming unable to stay upright in most cases. Tree growth is stunted, and new stems and limbs are unable to grow, are distorted, or are rosetted. The limbs of affected trees are distinctly "flat", caused by atrophy of the vascular tissue. On some trees, like Quince, bark necrosis and discolored leaves can occur.

Impact
ARW rarely occurs by itself, and instead often occurs along with multiple other diseases, such as powdery mildew and scabbing. Its biggest effect in losses is through fruit yield, which can be reduced by 10–30%, though it isn't of much economic significance in countries where it is extant. It is transmitted from tree to tree through grafting of infected limbs.

ARW is known to infect multiple cultivars, including:
 Cydonia oblonga (quince)
 Malus (ornamental species apple)
 Malus baccata (Siberian crab apple)
 Malus domestica (apple)
 Prunus avium (sweet cherry)
 Prunus cerasus (sour cherry)
 Pyrus communis (European pear)

Treatment
In Europe, heat treatment can be used to render trees disease-free. A period of 7 days of dry heat exposure (38°C) is effective on young, infected trees.

References

Phenuiviridae